P. picta  may refer to:
 Parascorpaena picta, a marine fish species
 Phyllomacromia picta, a dragonfly species found in Africa
 Polymita picta, the Cuban land snail or painted snail, a large, air-breathing land snail species endemic to Cuba
 Polystira picta, a sea snail species
 Psittacella picta, the painted tiger parrot, a bird species found in Indonesia and Papua New Guinea
 Pterygotrigla picta, the spotted gurnard, a fish species found in the Indo-Pacific oceans
 Pyrola picta, the white-veined wintergreen or whitevein shinleaf, a perennial herb species native to western North America
 Pyrrhura picta, the painted parakeet or painted conure, a bird species found in restricted forests in northern South America and Panama

See also
 Picta